Leeswood is a village, community and electoral ward in Flintshire, Wales, about four miles from the historic market town of Mold. At the 2001 census, the population was 2,143, reducing slightly to 2,135 at the 2011 census.

It was the centre of attention during the Mold Riot of 1869, where the owners of the mine refused to allow the speaking of the Welsh language in the mines.

Around a quarter of Leeswood's resident population has some knowledge of the Welsh language, exceeding the county's average of 21.4%. In all categories of linguistic competency, the ward performs around the Flintshire average, although the proportion of those able only to understand spoken Welsh is higher than the county and national average.

The famous White Gates of Leeswood Hall were attributed to the Davies brothers of Wrexham. The family of smiths were known in the 18th century for their high-quality work using wrought-iron.

The Wynne baronets were later to live in Leeswood Hall around the middle of the 18th century. The family history of the baronets can be traced to the lineage of Welsh kings and princes, as well as Owain Glyndŵr.

References

External links 

 Photos of Leeswood and surrounding area on geograph.org.uk

Villages in Flintshire